Caning is a widely used form of corporal punishment in Singapore. It can be divided into several contexts: judicial, prison, reformatory, military, school, and domestic. These practices of caning as punishment were introduced during the period of British colonial rule in Singapore. Similar forms of corporal punishment are also used in some other former British colonies, including two of Singapore's neighbouring countries, Malaysia and Brunei.

Of these, judicial caning is the most severe. It is applicable to only male convicts under the age of 50 for a wide range of offences under the Criminal Procedure Code, up to a maximum of 24 strokes per trial. Always ordered in addition to a prison sentence, it is inflicted by specially trained prison staff using a long and thick rattan cane on the prisoner's bare buttocks in an enclosed area in the prison. Male criminals who were not sentenced to caning earlier in a court of law may also be punished by caning in the same way if they commit aggravated offences while serving time in prison. Similarly, male juvenile delinquents in reformatories may be punished by caning for serious offences.

Servicemen in the Singapore Armed Forces (SAF) who commit serious military offences may be sentenced by a military court to a less severe form of caning in the SAF Detention Barracks, which houses military offenders.

In a much milder form, caning is used as a disciplinary measure in schools. Boys aged between 6 and 19 may be given up to three strokes with a light rattan cane on the buttocks over clothing or the palm of the hand as a punishment for serious misconduct, often as a last resort. As the law does not allow schools to cane girls, they receive alternative forms of punishment such as detention or suspension.

A smaller cane or other implement is often used by some parents to punish their children. This practice is allowed in Singapore but not encouraged by the government. The Singaporean government has stated that in its opinion, the Convention on the Rights of the Child does not prohibit "the judicious application of corporal punishment in the best interest of the child."

Judicial caning

History
Caning, as a form of legally sanctioned corporal punishment for convicted criminals, was first introduced to Malaya and Singapore during the period of British colonial rule in the 19th century. It was formally codified under the Straits Settlements Penal Code Ordinance IV in 1871.

In that era, offences punishable by caning were similar to those punishable by birching or flogging (with the cat o' nine tails) in England and Wales. They included robbery, aggravated forms of theft, burglary, assault with the intention of sexual abuse, a second or subsequent conviction of rape, a second or subsequent offence relating to prostitution, and living on or trading in prostitution.

Caning remained on the statute book after Malaya became independent from Britain in 1957, and after Singapore ceased to be part of Malaysia in 1965. Subsequent legislation has been passed by the Parliament of Singapore over the years to increase the minimum strokes an offender receives, and the number of crimes that may be punished with caning.

Legal basis
Sections 325–332 of the Criminal Procedure Code lay down the procedures governing caning. They include the following:

A male offender between the ages of 18 and 50 who has been certified to be in a fit state of health by a medical officer is liable to be caned.
The offender shall receive no more than 24 strokes of the cane on any one occasion, irrespective of the total number of offences committed. In other words, a man cannot be sentenced to more than 24 strokes of the cane in a single trial, but he may receive more than 24 strokes if the sentences are given out in separate trials. However, in the first case where a prisoner was received more than 24 strokes in a single trial, armed robber Qwek Kee Chong (who served ten years in prison) was given 48 strokes of the cane on 8 April 1988 and later hospitalised for his grievous injuries from the caning; he was later granted compensation for this error.
If the offender is under 18, he may receive up to 10 strokes of the cane, but a lighter cane will be used in this case. Boys under 16 may be sentenced to caning only by the High Court and not by the State Courts.
Offenders sentenced to death whose sentences have not been commuted shall not be caned.
The rattan cane used shall not exceed  in diameter.
Caning must not be carried out in instalments. This is to ensure that prisoners sentenced to caning are done with it in a single session and do not have to go through the process repeatedly even if the full sentence might not have been administered for medical reasons.

Any male convict, whether sentenced to caning or not, may also be caned in prison if he commits certain offences while serving time in prison.

Singapore has not signed or ratified a number of international human rights treaties which prohibit the use of corporal punishment. These include the International Covenant on Civil and Political Rights, the Convention Against Torture and the International Convention for the Protection of All Persons from Enforced Disappearance.

Exemptions
Under the law, women, men above the age of 50, and men sentenced to death whose sentences have not been commuted, cannot be sentenced to caning.

It was not uncommon for the courts to extend, by up to 12 months, the prison terms of offenders originally sentenced to caning but later found to be medically unfit to undergo the punishment. However, on 9 May 2017, the High Court ruled that the courts should not automatically impose an additional jail term in lieu of caning unless there are reasons to do so. According to judicial indicative guidelines, in situations where the court has to extend a convict's prison term in lieu of caning, the extension will range from nine to 12 months when the case involves more than 19 strokes of the cane.

Offences punishable by caning
Singaporean law allows caning to be ordered for over 35 offences, including hostage-taking/kidnapping, robbery, gang robbery with murder, rioting, causing grievous hurt, drug abuse, vandalism, extortion, voyeurism, sexual abuse, molestation (outrage of modesty), and unlawful possession of weapons. Caning is also a mandatory punishment for certain offences such as rape, drug trafficking, illegal moneylending, and for foreigners who overstay by more than 90 days – a measure designed to deter illegal immigrants.

While most of Singapore's laws on offences punishable by caning were inherited from the British legal system through the Indian Penal Code, the Vandalism Act was only introduced in 1966 after independence, in what has been argued to be an attempt by the ruling People's Action Party (PAP) to suppress the opposition's activities in the 1960s because opposition supporters vandalised public property with anti-PAP graffiti. Vandalism was originally prohibited by the Minor Offences Act, which made it punishable by a fine of up to S$50 or a week in jail, but did not permit caning. As of today, the Vandalism Act imposes a mandatory caning sentence of between three and eight strokes for a conviction of vandalism. Caning is not imposed on first-time offenders who use delible substances (e.g. pencil, crayon, chalk) to commit vandalism.

Beginning in the 1990s, the higher courts have been more inclined to impose caning sentences in cases where caning is a discretionary punishment. For example, in 1993, an 18-year-old molester was initially sentenced to six months' imprisonment but he appealed against his sentence. Chief Justice Yong Pung How not only dismissed his appeal, but also added three strokes of the cane to the sentence. This precedent set by the Chief Justice became a benchmark for sentences in molestation cases, where the court is expected to sentence a molester to at least nine months' imprisonment and three strokes of the cane if the offence involves touching the victim's private parts.

In some cases, male employees can be sentenced to caning for offences committed by the company they work for. For instance, the Dangerous Fireworks Act states that caning is mandatory for a manager or owner of a company which imports, delivers or sells dangerous fireworks. Another example is the transporting of illegal immigrants; a manager of a company who authorises or participates in such activity can be sentenced to caning. In July 1998, police reported six cases of employers sentenced to imprisonment and caning for hiring illegal immigrants.

The importation of chewing gum is subject only to fines; it is not and has never been an offence punishable by caning.

Statistics
In 1993, the number of caning sentences ordered by the courts was 3,244.

By 2007, this figure had doubled to 6,404, of which about 95% were actually implemented. Since 2007, the number of caning sentences has experienced an overall decline, falling to just 1,257 in 2016.

Caning takes place at several institutions around Singapore, most notably Changi Prison, and including the now defunct Queenstown Remand Centre, where Michael Fay was caned in 1994. Canings are also administered in Drug Rehabilitation Centres.

Most caning sentences are far below the legal limit of 24 strokes. Although sentences of between three and six strokes are much more common, they usually receive less or no coverage by the media. Normally, only the more serious cases involving heavier sentences will have a greater tendency to be reported in the press.

Caning officers
The prison officers who administer caning are carefully selected and specially trained for the job. They are generally physically fit and strongly built. Some hold high grades in martial arts even though proficiency in martial arts is not a requirement for the job. They are trained to use their entire body weight as the power behind every stroke instead of using only the strength from their arms, as well as to induce as much pain as possible.

The cane
It is about twice as thick as the canes used in the school and military contexts. The cane is soaked in water overnight to make it supple and prevent it from splitting and embedding splinters in the wounds. The Prisons Department denies that the cane is soaked in brine, but has said that it is treated with antiseptic before use to prevent infection. A lighter cane is used for juvenile offenders.

Administration procedure
Caning is, in practice, always ordered in addition to a jail sentence, and not as a punishment by itself. Those who are sentenced to caning and are in the process of appealing against their sentences do not have their sentences carried out while pending the outcome of their appeals. Similarly, during the period before the convicts' deadlines of their appeal notices, caning is not carried out until the deadline expires and with the convict not making a notice of appeal.

It is administered in an enclosed area in the prison out of the view of the public and other inmates. However, anecdotal evidence suggests that the offender, while waiting in a queue for his turn to be caned, has the chance to observe or hear the screams and cries of those before him getting caned. The order is determined by the number of strokes the offender is receiving, with the largest number going first. A medical officer and the Superintendent of Prisons are required to be present at every caning session.

The offender is not told in advance when he will be caned; he is notified only on the day his sentence is to be carried out. Offenders often undergo a lot of psychological distress as a result of being put into such uncertainty. On the day itself, the medical officer examines him by measuring his blood pressure and other physical conditions to check whether he is medically fit for the caning. If he is certified fit, he proceeds to receive his punishment; if he is certified unfit, he is sent back to the court for the sentence to be remitted or converted to additional time in prison. A prison officer confirms with him the number of strokes he has been sentenced to.

In practice, the offender is required to strip completely naked for the caning. Once he has removed his clothes, he is restrained in a large wooden trestle based on the British dual-purpose prison flogging frame. He stands barefooted on the trestle base and bends over a padded horizontal crossbar on one side of the trestle, with the crossbar adjusted to around his waist level. His feet are tied to a lower crossbar on the same side by restraining ankle cuffs made of leather, while his hands are secured to another horizontal crossbar on the other side by wrist cuffs of similar design; his hands can hold on to the crossbar. After he is secured to the trestle in a bent-over position at an angle of close to 90° at the hip, protective padding is tied around his lower back to protect the vulnerable kidney and lower spine area from any strokes that might land off-target. The punishment is administered on his bare buttocks to minimise the risk of any injury to bones and organs. He is not gagged.

The caning officer positions himself beside the trestle. The Director of Prisons explained in a 1974 press conference, "Correct positioning is critically important. If he is too near the prisoner, the tip of the cane will fall beyond the buttocks and the force of the stroke will cause the unsupported tip to dip and bend the cane and thus reduce the effect of the stroke. If he is too far, the stroke will only cover part of the buttocks." Strokes are delivered at intervals of about 30 seconds. The caning officer is required to exert as much strength as he can muster for each stroke. The offender receives all the strokes in a single caning session, not in instalments. According to anecdotal evidence, if the sentence involves a large number of strokes, two or more officers will take turns to cane the offender every six strokes to ensure that the later strokes are as forceful as the earlier ones.

During the caning, if the medical officer certifies that the offender is not in a fit state of health to undergo the rest of the punishment, the caning must be stopped. The offender will then be sent back to the court for the remaining number of strokes to be remitted or converted to a prison term of no more than 12 months, in addition to the original prison term he was sentenced to.

Effects 
Caning can cause significant physical damage, depending largely on the number of strokes inflicted. Michael Fay, who received four strokes, said in an interview, "The skin did rip open, there was some blood. I mean, let's not exaggerate, and let's not say a few drops or that the blood was gushing out. It was in between the two. It's like a bloody nose."

A report by the Singapore Bar Association stated, "The blows are applied with the full force of the jailer's arm. When the rattan hits the bare buttocks, the skin disintegrates, leaving a white line and then a flow of blood."

Usually, the buttocks will be covered with blood after three strokes. More profuse bleeding may occur in the case of a larger number of strokes. An eyewitness described that after 24 strokes, the buttocks will be a "bloody mess".

Men who were caned have variously described the pain they experienced as "unbearable", "excruciating", "equivalent to getting hit by a lorry", "having a hot iron placed on your buttocks", etc. A recipient of 10 strokes said, "The pain was beyond description. If there is a word stronger than excruciating, that should be the word to describe it".

Most offenders struggle violently after each of the first three strokes and then their struggles lessen as they become weaker. By the time the caning is over, those who receive more than three strokes will be in a state of shock. During the caning, some offenders will pretend to faint but they have not been able to fool the medical officer, who decides whether the punishment continues or stops. Offenders often undergo a lot of psychological distress before and during the caning: They are not only afraid of the physical pain, but are also worried whether they can prevent themselves from crying out because crying means that they would "lose face" and be labelled "weak" by their fellow inmates.

Gopal Baratham, a Singaporean neurosurgeon and opponent of the practice, in his book The Caning of Michael Fay: The Inside Story by a Singaporean, criticised the American tabloid press for false claims, such as that canings are public events (in fact they always take place privately inside the prison):

Recovery
After the caning, the offender is released from the trestle and receives medical treatment. Antiseptic lotion (gentian violet) is applied on the wounds. The offender is also given painkillers and antibiotics.

The wounds usually take between a week and a month to heal, depending on the number of strokes received. During this time, offenders cannot sit down or lie down on their backs, and experience difficulties controlling their bowels. Bleeding from the buttocks may still occur in the days after the caning. M Ravi, a human-rights lawyer, described the injuries of his client, Ye Ming Yuen, who received 24 strokes, as follows: 

Permanent scars remain after the wounds have healed.

Notable cases

Foreigners
Beh Meng Chai, a 22-year-old Malaysian and native of Perak who was one of the three perpetrators of the Jurong fishing port murders. After his arrest in 1982, Beh was initially charged with two counts of murder for killing the two victims Teo Keng Siang and Lee Cheng Tiong, but eventually, Beh was convicted of two charges of manslaughter and two armed robbery charges, and sentenced to life imprisonment and a total of 28 strokes of the cane, although the caning was reduced to 24 strokes given that it exceeded the maximum 24 strokes required to be imposed in a single trial. As for Beh's other two accomplices, one of them, Chng Meng Joo, remained at large as of today for the killings while the other, Sim Min Teck, was arrested in 1983 and sentenced to death for murder. Sim, who was eventually executed after losing his appeal, did not receive caning since death row convicts were not allowed to be caned.

 Nyu Kok Meng (21), a convicted armed robber from Malaysia who was sentenced to life imprisonment and six strokes of the cane in July 1985 for possessing a rifle while committing armed robbery at Andrew Road under the Arms Offences Act. He had an accomplice, Sek Kim Wah, who was hanged in 1988 for killing three of the five victims they robbed together before Nyu protected the remaining two victims from Sek's murderous rampage upon Nyu discovering Sek murdering the three victims.
 Michael P. Fay, an 18-year-old American citizen convicted of vandalism in March 1994 and sentenced to four months' imprisonment, a S$3,500 fine, and six strokes of the cane. This incident attracted worldwide publicity and sparked a minor diplomatic crisis between Singapore and the United States. Despite an appeal for clemency from U.S. President Bill Clinton to commute the caning sentence, Singapore's President Ong Teng Cheong refused to pardon Fay, but nonetheless reduced Fay's caning sentence from six to four strokes out of consideration for the long years of diplomatic ties between Singapore and the US. Fay was caned on 5 May 1994 in Queenstown Remand Prison.
 Galing Kujat, a convicted robber from Sarawak, Malaysia. He and his friend Kho Jabing had attacked and robbed two Chinese construction workers. After being continuously hit on the head with a tree branch by Kho, one of the two victims died six days later. Both Galing and Kho were arrested, found guilty of murder in July 2010, and sentenced to death. In May 2011, Galing made a successful appeal and as a result, his charge was reduced to robbery with hurt. His sentence was then reduced to 18 years and six months imprisonment and 19 strokes of the cane. On the other hand, Kho lost his appeal and eventually, he was executed on 20 May 2016.
 Oliver Fricker, a Swiss national who was sentenced on 25 June 2010 to five months' imprisonment and three strokes of the cane for breaking into the SMRT Trains Changi Depot and vandalising an MRT train by spraypainting it.
 Yong Vui Kong, a Malaysian who was caught trafficking heroin in 2007. He was spared the death penalty and re-sentenced to life imprisonment and 15 strokes of the cane in 2013 after Singapore changed its laws on drug trafficking. (See Yong Vui Kong v Public Prosecutor for the background of the case). Yong, acting through his lawyer M Ravi, made an appeal to the Court of Appeal against his caning sentence. Ravi argued that the corporal punishment violated the Constitution because it was racist and discriminatory. In 2015, three judges, including Chief Justice Sundaresh Menon, ruled that caning was not unconstitutional and dismissed Yong's appeal.
 Cheong Chun Yin, a 24-year-old Malaysian and a convicted drug trafficker who imported more than 2700 grams of heroin from Myanmar into Singapore on 16 June 2008. Cheong and his accomplice Pang Siew Fum were both sentenced to death in 2010. Due to reforms to capital drug laws in 2013, Cheong was certified as a courier and thus on 20 April 2015, he had his death sentence commuted to life imprisonment and 15 strokes of the cane. Pang herself also had her sentence reduced to life due to depression but was not caned due to her being a female.
 Tony Anak Imba, Hairee Anak Landak and Donny Anak Meluda, three of the four Malaysians who were charged with the armed robbery and murder of 41-year-old Indian construction worker Shanmuganathan Dillidurai, who was the fourth and final victim of the 2010 Kallang slashing. Out of the three aforementioned convicts, Tony was found guilty of murder and sentenced in 2015 to life imprisonment and 24 strokes of the cane, while both Hairee and Donny were each convicted of armed robbery with hurt and sentenced to 33 years in prison and 24 strokes of the cane in 2013 and 2018 respectively. On the other hand, Micheal Anak Garing, the fourth member and mastermind of the murder, was given the death penalty for murder and executed on 22 March 2019 after his plea for clemency failed; he did not receive caning since caning is not allowed for prisoners awaiting execution by the state.
 Yap Weng Wah, a Malaysian engineer and hebephilic who sexually assaulted 31 boys whom he befriended online in Singapore between November 2009 and June 2012. He apparently also filmed the sexual acts and saved the footage (about 2,000 of them) in his laptop to watch while he masturbated. He was also found to be responsible for victimising at least 14 boys in Malaysia. He was sentenced to 30 years in jail and 24 strokes of the cane on 20 March 2015.
 Gobi Avedian, a Malaysian who was charged with illegally transporting 40.22g of heroin. Gobi made a defence that he did not know what he delivered was heroin, as he was told that he was delivering disco drugs mixed with chocolate, which was disbelieved by the prosecution. In 2017, the High Court sentenced Gobi to 15 years' imprisonment and ten strokes of the cane for a reduced charge of attempted trafficking of a Class C drug. A year later, however, upon the prosecution's appeal, the Court of Appeal sentenced Gobi to death for the original capital charge. Eventually, after several legal attempts to challenge his death sentence, Gobi was granted a re-trial in October 2020 and the Court of Appeal finally agreed to revoke his death sentence, and restored his original sentence of 15 years' imprisonment with ten strokes of the cane.
 David James Roach, a Canadian who fled Singapore to Thailand soon after a 2016 robbery case, and spent nearly a year in a Thai prison before travelling to UK, where he was caught and extradited back to Singapore on the assurance that he would not be caned. He was given a five-year jail term with 6 strokes of the cane on 7 July 2021. 18 days later, Roach's caning sentence was remitted upon a presidential pardon granted by President of Singapore Halimah Yacob.
 Dominic Martin Fernandez, a 24-year-old Malaysian who was arrested for drug trafficking. Since he was a certified courier, Dominic was sentenced to life imprisonment and 15 strokes of the cane. His accomplice, 54-year-old Singaporean Nazeri Lajim, was sentenced to death and executed on 22 July 2022.
 Ahmad Muin Yaacob, a 23-year-old Malaysian cleaner who was charged with robbing and murdering his 54-year-old supervisor Maimunah Awang after a heated quarrel at Tanah Merah Ferry Terminal in November 2016. According to Ahmad's confession, he used a grass cutter to stab Maimunah on the neck and chest, and hit her head repeatedly before he stole the victim's gold bracelets and necklaces, which he pawned for more than RM9,500 to cover his wedding expenses. Ahmad fled to Malaysia but he was caught nearly a month later in his hometown at Kelantan, and he was sentenced to life imprisonment and 18 strokes of the cane on 4 November 2020, after the High Court found him guilty of murder under Section 300(c) of the Penal Code.

Singaporeans
Harun bin Ripin, one of the two robbers charged with the robbery and murder of 58-year-old Poon Sai Im, a widow who lived on Pulau Ubin. Harun, then 26 years old, was found guilty in 1974 of a reduced charge of robbery by night and sentenced to 12 years' imprisonment and 12 strokes of the cane, while the other accomplice Mohamed Yasin bin Hussin was sentenced to death for murder. In the aftermath, Yasin appealed and his sentence was commuted to ten years in prison for both lower charges of attempted rape and causing death by a rash or negligent act, but he did not receive caning for both charges.
 Zainal Abidin Abdul Malik, a Singaporean who committed armed robbery in 1987. Although there were no specific details of how he committed the crime, Zainal Abidin was reportedly convicted and sentenced to three years' imprisonment and twelve strokes of the cane in 1988. A few years after his release from prison, Zainal Abidin would gain notoreity in 1994 for the violent murder of a 47-year-old police officer named Boo Tiang Huat by fatally striking the cop's head with an axe. Zainal Abidin was subsequently sentenced to death and hanged on 30 August 1996, but he never received caning for the murder since the law forbids caning for any convicts who received the death penalty in Singapore.
 Chua Gin Boon, a 26-year-old Singaporean gang member who was the accomplice of Ong Yeow Tian in an attempted housebreaking case in February 1989, where both were caught by the police. Chua, who also committed burglary in October 1988, was convicted in March 1989 and sentenced to six strokes of the cane and a jail term of two years and three months. However, Ong, who resisted arrest and murdered a policeman and even fired two shots at two other policemen, was sentenced to death for illegal discharge of firearms under the Arms Offences Act and hanged on 25 November 1994. By law, caning was not allowed in Ong's case since he was ordered to serve a death sentence for his offences.
 Abdul Nasir bin Amer Hamsah and Abdul Rahman bin Arshad, two Malay Singaporeans who were both arrested and charged in 1996 with the 1994 murder of a Japanese tourist named Fujii Isae in Oriental Hotel. The two men had also robbed and assaulted Fujii and her companion Takishita Miyoko in the women's hotel room before Fujii died. It was revealed that one of them, Abdul Nasir, had accidentally stepped on Fujii's face while escaping, leading to facial fractures that caused Fujii to suffocate to death. Both Abdul Nasir and Abdul Rahman were eventually found guilty of robbery with hurt; Abdul Rahman was sentenced to 10 years' imprisonment with 16 strokes of the cane while Abdul Nasir was sentenced to 18 years' imprisonment and 18 strokes of the cane. Abdul Nasir was later in 1997 sentenced to an additional 12 strokes of the cane and life imprisonment for an unrelated kidnapping case.
 Ng Hua Chye, a Singaporean part-time tour guide who was charged with the abuse and murder of his 19-year-old Indonesian maid Muawanatul Chasanah in December 2001. Ng, who surrendered himself to the police, admitted that, during the nine months Chasanah spent working for his family, both he and his wife Rainbow Tan Chai Hong had kicked, punched, scalded and starved the maid, who weighed only 36 kg and sustained more than 200 injuries at the time of her death at Ng's sister's flat. A year later, Ng was later convicted of one charge of culpable homicide not amounting to murder and four out of seven charges of voluntarily causing hurt in relation to Chasanah's abuse and death. After Ng's conviction in July 2002, the High Court sentenced 47-year-old Ng Hua Chye to 12 strokes of the cane and a jail term of 18 years and six months, the latter which was then the longest sentence ever meted out to a convicted maid abuser. Ng's 30-year-old wife was also jailed nine months for maid abuse; however, due to her gender, she was not caned.
 The eight gang members of Salakau, who were the perpetrators of a gang attack at South Bridge Road, in which a 17-year-old soccer player Sulaiman bin Hashim died on 31 May 2001 due to grievous injuries; six suspects were arrested while the other two - Sharulhawzi Ramly and Muhammad Syamsul Ariffin Brahim - were not found. Of all the six convicted attackers, the 21-year-old gang leader Norhisham Mohamad Dahlan was sentenced to ten years' jail and 16 strokes of the cane for culpable homicide; 22-year-old Muhamad Hasik Sahar was sentenced to life imprisonment and 16 strokes of the cane for culpable homicide; 19-year-old Khairul Famy Mohamed Samsudin and 20-year-old Fazely Rahmat were each sentenced to seven years' jail and 12 strokes of the cane for causing grievous hurt; and finally, 18-year-old Mohammad Fahmi Abdul Shukor and 20-year-old Mohammad Ridzwan Samad were each sentenced to three years' jail and six strokes of the cane for rioting.
 Chua Ser Lien (42 years old) and Tan Ping Koon (35 years old), the two men who kidnapped a seven-year-old girl for ransom on Christmas Day of 2003, but they released the girl thirty minutes after the abduction as they were tailed by a witness of the crime. The motive behind the kidnapping was due to the men's desperate need for money to pay off their tremendous debts. Both men were arrested two days later and in September 2004, Chua and Tan were each sentenced to life imprisonment and three strokes of the cane. 17 years later, Chua died at the age of 58 while in prison, as a result of suicide.
 Stilwell Ong Keat Pin, an 18-year-old gang leader who masterminded a fatal gang attack that led to the death of 19-year-old Darren Ng Wei Jie in October 2010. Ong and his 11 fellow members (aged between 16 and 22) were all arrested and charged with murder. Later, the murder charges were reduced to rioting for seven of Ong's members, while Ong and the four other key attackers faced lower charges of culpable homicide. Among the five charged with culpable homicide, Ong was sentenced to 12 years' jail and 12 strokes of the cane; Ho Wui Ming received 11 years and 3 months' jail with 10 strokes of the cane; both Chen Wei Zhen and Edward Tay Wei Loong each received a sentence of 10 years' jail and 10 strokes of the cane; Louis Tong Qing Yao was sentenced to 8 years' imprisonment and 11 strokes of the cane. The other seven gang members received jail terms between three years and six years and caning between three and six strokes for rioting. Stilwell Ong was given an early release from prison for good behaviour in December 2018, but he re-offended and returned to court two years later for cheating, drug consumption and traffic offences, and he received six strokes of the cane in addition to a $8,200 fine and a jail term of two years, two months and four weeks.
 Tan Hong Sheng and Ang Da Yuan, two of the seven suspects who were involved in the 2019 Orchard Towers murder of 31-year-old chemist Satheesh Noel Gobidass. Initially charged with murder, Ang was sentenced to eight months' imprisonment and six strokes of the cane for a reduced charge of voluntarily causing hurt. Tan was also sentenced to 12 strokes of the cane in addition to a jail sentence of four years and nine months for consorting with an armed individual and other unrelated rioting offences. Four of the remaining five were given either conditional warnings or jail terms without caning for lesser charges, while the final suspect, Tan Sen Yang, is currently awaiting trial for murder.
 Ridzuan Mega Abdul Rahman, a convicted child abuser who abused his five-year-old son to death, notably by repeated scalding of the child. Initially charged with murder, Ridzuan was found guilty of voluntarily causing grievous harm in April 2020, and sentenced to 27 years' imprisonment and 24 strokes of the cane. Ridzuan's sentence was later increased to life imprisonment, but is not sentenced to caning. His wife, Azlin Arujunah, was initially sentenced to 28 years in prison for child abuse and causing grievous harm but eventually convicted of murder after the prosecution appealed, and she received a life sentence despite the prosecutors' arguments for a death sentence.
 Pua Hak Chuan, a 38-year-old Singaporean who, together with his 31-year-old wife Tan Hui Zhen, were charged with the murder of their 26-year-old flatmate Annie Ee Yu Lian, an intellectually disabled waitress who lived with them since 2013. The couple had abused Ee cruelly and relentlessly for eight months leading up to her death on 13 April 2015 as a result of acute fat embolism caused by the beatings. An autopsy report also revealed that Annie Ee suffered 12 fractured ribs, seven fractured vertebrae, a ruptured stomach and a body full of blisters and bruises. The murder charges were eventually reduced to voluntarily causing grievous hurt with a dangerous weapon, and on 1 December 2017, Pua received 14 strokes of the cane in addition to a 14-year sentence behind bars after pleading guilty to the lower charges; Tan receives a heavier jail term of 16 years and six months for the same offences but spared the cane due to her gender.
 Mohamad Yazid Md Yusof, a Singaporean drug trafficker who was caught importing 120.60g of diamorphine in 2013. He was certified as a courier and sentenced to life imprisonment and 15 strokes of the cane in 2016. His accomplice Kalwant Singh Jogindar Singh and mastermind Norasharee Gous were sentenced to death and hanged on 7 July 2022.
 Mohamed Aliff Mohamed Yusoff, a 27-year-old Singaporean who deliberately slammed the head of his girlfriend's nine-month-old son Izz Fayyaz Zayani Ahmad against the floorboard of his van twice, resulting in the death of the baby from intracranial hemorrhage (or bleeding of the brain) caused by traumatic head injuries. Aliff was charged with voluntarily causing grievous hurt at first, before the charge was upgraded to murder. Aliff was found guilty of murder after a seven-day trial in July 2022, and he was sentenced to life imprisonment with fifteen strokes of the cane on 11 August 2022.
 Surajsrikan Diwakar Mani Tripathi, a 20-year-old Singaporean who murdered 38-year-old Tay Rui Hao. The defence argued he had psychiatric disorders. Although found guilty of murder, Surajsrikan was spared the death penalty and instead sentenced to life imprisonment and 15 strokes of the cane on 15 September 2022.

Comparison of judicial caning in Brunei, Malaysia and Singapore

Judicial caning is also used as a form of legal punishment for criminal offences in two of Singapore's neighbouring countries, Brunei and Malaysia. There are some differences across the three countries.

Prison caning
Male convicts who are not sentenced to caning by the courts may be caned if they commit aggravated or serious offences in prison while serving their sentences. This type of caning is carried out in the same way as judicial caning ordered by the courts.

A prison superintendent may order an inmate to receive up to 12 strokes of the cane for aggravated offences that have serious implications for institutional order and discipline. Such offences include engaging in gang activities, mutiny, attempting to escape, destruction of prison property, and assaulting prison staff or fellow inmates. Upon receiving a report of an offence, the prison provost officers will conduct an investigation to collect and review evidence. After that, the accused inmate is given an opportunity to hear the charge and evidence against him and present his defence before a superintendent. The case will also be reviewed by an independent committee appointed by the Ministry of Home Affairs (MHA), comprising reputable members of the public and including at least one legally-trained member. After that, the Commissioner of Prisons will review the case and confirm the punishment imposed or vary it accordingly. Depending on the circumstances, the case may be referred to a visiting justice, who has the authority to order an inmate to be caned.

In 2021, the MHA revealed that from 2011 to 2020, the Singapore Prison Service administered 2,875 instances of prison caning to 2,149 inmates for committing aggravated or major offences in prison. The median number of strokes was three and the most common offences involved aggravated violence against other inmates and violence against prison staff. No cases were referred to visiting justices during that period.

Military caning
In the Singapore Armed Forces (SAF), a subordinate military court, or the officer in charge of the SAF Detention Barracks, may sentence a serviceman to a maximum of 24 strokes of the cane for committing certain military offences or for committing aggravated offences while being detained in the Detention Barracks. In all cases, the caning sentence must be approved by the Armed Forces Council before it can be administered. The minimum age for a serviceman to be sentenced to caning is 16 (now 16½ de facto, since entry into the SAF is restricted to those above that age). This form of caning was originally intended primarily for use on recalcitrant teenage conscripts serving full-time National Service in the SAF.

Military caning is less severe than its civilian counterpart, and is designed not to cause undue bleeding or to leave permanent scars. The offender must be certified by a medical officer to be in a fit condition of health to undergo the punishment and shall wear "protective clothing" as prescribed. The punishment is administered on the buttocks, which are covered by a "protective guard" to prevent cuts. During the punishment, the offender is secured in a bent-over position to a trestle similar to the one used for judicial/prison canings.

Reformatory caning
Caning is used as a form of legal corporal punishment in government homes, remand homes and other homes for youths.

Youths aged 16 and below who have allegedly committed crimes may be placed in remand homes during the period of investigation. If convicted, they may be sent to the state-run reformatories, namely the Singapore Boys' Home and the Singapore Girls' Home, for up to three years. The Singapore Boys' Home has youths aged 11 through 18 who have been sent there by the courts for committing offences such as theft, robbery or rioting, or because they have been deemed to be Beyond Parental Control.

Youths whose parents have applied for Beyond Parental Control orders against them are placed in remand homes during the period of investigation. They may thereafter be placed in homes which also house juvenile offenders.

The superintendents of reformatories are allowed to impose corporal punishment, in the form of caning, on only male residents as a last resort for serious misconduct. They are required to maintain a record of the details and evidence of the offender's misconduct and their reasons for using corporal punishment as a last resort. Persons with mental or physical disability are exempted from such punishment. Solitary confinement is also permitted for children of and above 12 years of age, except in remand homes.

Caning is administered in private by the superintendent in the presence of a staff member, or by a staff member authorised by the superintendent in the presence of another staff member. A maximum of ten strokes may be inflicted on either the palm of the hand or the buttocks over clothing.

In the Singapore Boys' Home, boys are routinely caned on the buttocks for serious offences such as fighting, bullying and absconding. A 2006 article in The Straits Times reported that there were two cases of bullying per month on average; one youth also said that he had been caned over 60 times in three years at the Singapore Boys' Home. A former Singapore Boys' Home resident who received 10 strokes for absconding when he was 18 said that his buttocks took two weeks to heal sufficiently before he could sit down properly.

In the Singapore Girls' Home, punishments for serious offences may include solitary confinement in a windowless room. Previously, caning on the palm of the hand was allowed for female residents and had been carried out before. However, the Children and Young Persons (Government Homes) Regulations 2011 now clearly prohibits corporal punishment for female residents.

Apart from the Singapore Boys' Home and Singapore Girls' Home, there are other juvenile institutions managed by voluntary welfare organisations, such as the Boys Town operated by the Montfort Brothers of St. Gabriel for boys of ages 11 to 21. Although these juvenile institutions are legally allowed to administer corporal punishment on male offenders in the same way as the state-run reformatories, they must obtain the management committee's authorisation before carrying it out.

School caning
Caning is a legal disciplinary measure in primary and secondary schools, junior colleges and centralised institutes. Under Section 88 of the Education (Schools) Regulations, it is permitted for male students only.

The Ministry of Education (MOE) states that corporal punishment is allowed for serious or repeated misconduct under the Education (Schools) Regulations, and adds that counselling and follow-up guidance should be carried out. At most schools, caning comes after detention but before suspension in the hierarchy of penalties. Some schools implement a demerit points system, in which students receive mandatory caning after accumulating a certain number of demerit points for a wide range of misconduct. The possibility of caning as a corrective action is often explicitly stated in schools' student handbooks or on their websites. As of 2018, 13% of primary schools and 53% of secondary schools (excluding all-girls schools) communicated on their websites that caning may be administered to male students for serious misconduct.

Canings in school may be sorted into these categories:
 Private caning: The most common form of school caning. The offending student is caned in the school's General Office in the presence of the Principal and/or Vice-Principal and another witness (usually the student's Form Teacher or Co-Form Teacher). His parents or guardians may be invited to the school to witness the punishment being meted out.
 Class caning: The offending student is caned in front of his class.
 Public caning: The offending student is caned in front of an assembly of the entire school population to serve as a warning for potential offenders. This form of punishment is normally reserved for very serious offences and repeated offences. Common offences that warrant a public caning include smoking, alcohol consumption, drug- or gang-related activities, fighting, causing hurt to others, vandalism, arson, extortion, theft and any case involving the Police.
 Others: There may be intermediate levels between a "class caning" and a "public caning", such as in front of all classes in the same year as the student.

Under MOE regulations, the punishment may be administered only by the Principal or any staff member under the Principal's express authority, usually the Vice Principal, Discipline Master, Operations Manager, or any other specially delegated member of the school's Disciplinary Committee. The offending student's parents or guardians must then be informed of the details at the earliest possible time once the punishment has been meted out. Some schools may seek parental or guardian consent before administering the punishment. A maximum of three strokes may be inflicted at a time, using a light rattan cane. The limit was previously six strokes before MOE reduced it to three strokes in 2017. The student may be caned only on either the palm of the hand or the buttocks over clothing. Although boys of any age from six to 19 may be caned, the majority of canings are of secondary school students aged 14 to 16 inclusive.
A solemn and formal ceremony, school caning is typically carried out in a manner similar to the caning punishments administered in England before school corporal punishment was banned there in 1998. Some schools tuck a protective item (e.g. book, file, rolled-up newspaper, piece of cardboard) into the student's waistband to protect his lower back in case a stroke lands off-target. The student then places his hands on a desk or chair, bends over or leans forward, and receives strokes from the rattan cane on the seat of his trousers or shorts.

Certain schools adopt special practices. For example, following English traditions, some schools (mainly all-boys schools) require the student to change into physical education (PE) attire for the punishment because PE shorts are apparently thinner than normal uniform trousers/shorts, even though the main purpose is probably to enhance the formality of the occasion. In some schools, if the caning is conducted in public, the student is required to make a public apology before or after receiving his punishment. Although caning on the palm of the hand is rarely implemented, one notable exception is Saint Andrew's Secondary School, where students may be caned on the hand for committing less serious offences while a caning on the buttocks is reserved for more serious offences.

Based on first-hand accounts, the student typically feels moderate to acute pain for the first few minutes, depending on the number of strokes. This soon leads to a stinging sensation and general soreness around the points of impact, usually lasting for some hours; sitting down is likely to be uncomfortable. Superficial bruises and weals may appear on the buttocks and last for a few days after the punishment.

Notable cases 
Routine school canings are normally not publicised, so only rare and special cases are reported in the media.
 1987: Seven students at Anglo-Chinese Junior College were given between one and three strokes of the cane for stealing audio equipment from one of the lecture theatres.
 1994: Six students at Pioneer Secondary School were publicly caned for assaulting a fellow student. One student's parents were unhappy as they believed that their son was innocent even though the Ministry of Education concluded that the school had thoroughly conducted the investigation.
 2001: 41 students at Fajar Secondary School were given two strokes of the cane each in the principal's office for skipping tests. 82 people who wrote to The Straits Times to share their views on this incident agreed with the principal's decision to punish the boys while the remaining 16 opposed.
 2002: Three students at Montfort Secondary School were publicly caned for repeatedly being disrespectful during the flag-raising ceremony despite having been warned earlier by the principal.
 2002: A 17-year-old student at Bishan Park Secondary School was given two strokes of the cane in public for assaulting a 50-year-old teacher during a school excursion to East Coast Park. The student was also fined S$1,000 by a court later in June 2003.
 2004: A seven-year-old student at a primary school in Jurong was given one stroke of the cane in public for an offence equivalent to an adult act of vandalism or throwing killer litter.
 2005: A student at Raffles Institution was publicly caned for defaming a teacher in the school's online forum.
 2006: A 17-year-old student at Siglap Secondary School was given two strokes of the cane in public for assaulting a 16-year-old student from Victoria School during a soccer match, causing the latter to suffer a fractured jaw.
 2006: A student at Pasir Ris Secondary School was publicly caned. Some parents strongly opposed the public manner of the punishment as they felt that it harmed the student's self-esteem and traumatised the other students who witnessed it.
 2008: Two 14-year-old students at Saint Andrew's Secondary School were publicly caned for attempting to use their mobile phones to take upskirt photos of a female teacher, who also made a police report after the incident. The news article also mentioned that a similar incident had happened in the previous year and the two students involved had also been publicly caned.
 2009: Three Secondary Three students at Anglo-Chinese School (Barker Road) were publicly caned for taunting, mocking and intimidating a Secondary One student.
 2009: Two Primary Five students at a primary school in Sembawang were publicly caned a few days before the end-of-year exams. Some students were distressed after witnessing the public canings.
 2011: A 15-year-old student and a 14-year-old student from Saint Andrew's Secondary School were each given one stroke of the cane in the school office for making threats on Facebook to fight in school.
 2016: 30 Secondary Two and Three students at Anglo-Chinese School (Barker Road) were caught taking, keeping or sharing upskirt photos and videos of six female teachers. One of them was expelled while seven were given two strokes of the cane in front of their respective levels. Nine others were caned in the principal's office.
 2017: An 11-year-old student at Horizon Primary School was given one stroke of the cane by the vice-principal in the school office for misbehaving. His parents later discovered cane marks on his thigh, along with bruising in the area. The school stated that the student had been counselled and had returned to school to continue his studies after the incident.
 2019: The mother of a 12-year-old student at St. Gabriel's Primary School lodged a police report after discovering cane marks on her son's arm and leg. The boy had been informally punished by the school's discipline headmistress after an altercation with a classmate, and the school had not informed his parents. As the punishment was not carried out according to the Ministry of Education's guidelines, the police investigated the incident as a case of voluntarily causing hurt.
 2021: A Secondary Two student at NSS (possibly Northbrooks Secondary School or Northland Secondary School, both in Yishun) was given three strokes of the cane for vaping (illegal in Singapore) and playing truant. He posted about the incident online as he wanted to check whether the school should have caned him the way it did. His post went viral and left readers humoured and slightly divided, several users saying that he deserved his punishment and that it was actually lenient.

Female students 
As the Ministry of Education does not allow any form of corporal punishment to be administered to female students, they receive alternative forms of punishment such as detention, Corrective Work Orders or suspension.

In 2004, Ng Lee Huat, the principal of Nan Chiau High School, controversially stepped down after admitting to hitting a 14-year-old female student with a soft-cover book.

Parental caning
 Caning is also meted out on children (both boys and girls) by their parents ( Both the Mother and the father at different times) as punishment for offences like poor/imperfect results, disrespect, disobedience, incomplete work, lying, and trying to escape caning. The misbehaving child is usually caned on the buttocks or palm of the hand. Sometimes, the cane will miss and hit the bare thighs/calves, causing more pain. The caning usually leaves the child with painful red welts that will fade within days.

The most commonly used implement is a thin and light rattan cane, commonly and cheaply found (for around 50 Singapore cents) in neighbourhood provision shops. There is usually higher demand when students prepare for examinations, and the cane will be used more often, resulting in breakages. Sometimes, parents will use other implements such as the rattan handle of a feather-duster, bamboo poles, rulers, clothes hangers, or even their bare hands.

In Singapore not caning children is seen as being soft on them, and not instilling proper discipline. According to a survey conducted by The Sunday Times in January 2009, 57 percent of surveyed parents expressed the view that caning was an acceptable form of punishment, and that they had used it on their children for reasons such as stubbornness, refusal to listen and dangerous/harmful acts. A newer study conducted by YouGov in 2019 found that nearly 80 percent of parents in Singapore had carried/carries out corporal punishment at home.

Parental caning is legal in Singapore, but not particularly encouraged by the authorities. Under the Children and Young Persons Act, ill-treatment of a child or young person is defined as inflicting any unnecessary physical pain, suffering or injury, any emotional harm, or any injury to a child's health or development. The person who has the custody, charge or care of the child or young person subjected to ill-treatment may be punished by a fine of up to S$8,000 or imprisonment of up to eight years, or both. Several factors are usually considered when determining if parental corporal punishment becomes a criminal offence: the proportionality of the punishment to the offence, the child's age, as well as the frequency of the punishment. The Ministry of Social and Family Development's Child Protective Service will also investigate and intervene where there are serious child protection concerns, such as when parental discipline results in serious physical injury or emotional trauma to a child.

Politicians' opinions on caning in Singapore

Judicial caning 

Judicial caning is purportedly meant to serve as a humiliating experience for offenders and as a strong deterrent to crime. In 1966, when Singapore's first Prime Minister, Lee Kuan Yew, introduced caning as a mandatory punishment for vandalism, he said in Parliament, "[...] if (the offender) knows he is going to get three of the best, I think he will lose a great deal of enthusiasm, because there is little glory attached to the rather humiliating experience of having to be caned."

In a 2004 interview with China Central Television, Lee explained why caning should continue in Singapore with reference to the 1994 Michael Fay incident: "Every country has its own problems to face, we know, certain things. You put a person in a prison, it makes no difference. He will not change. Because you observe certain rules, there's enough food, enough exercise, fresh air, sunshine ... But if you cane him, and he knows he will be given six of the best on his buttocks, and it will hurt for one week that he can't sit down comfortably, he will think again."

Although the extensive use of judicial caning is a policy commonly associated with the ruling People's Action Party (PAP), the opposition parties do not oppose it because they agree on its effectiveness as a deterrent to crime. Politicians from the opposition parties have voiced support for corporal punishment. Edmund Ng, a candidate for the Singapore Democratic Alliance in the 2006 general election, said, "For criminals, caning serves as a deterrent [...] I would not change a winning formula." Sylvia Lim, a Member of Parliament from the Workers' Party, also said in 2007, "What are the purposes of jail, fine and caning? Caning is controversial internationally, but if one must justify why we cane offenders, it is just deserts for pain which the offender has caused to the victim, for example, hurt, injury or the threat of violence. Caning is a severe punishment, and it is always combined with jail as the offences tend to be serious and to make it easier, administratively, to arrange for the caning to take place."

The severity and humiliation of the punishment are widely publicised in various ways, mainly through the press but also through other means such as the education system. For example, juvenile delinquents get to watch a real-life demonstration of caning on a dummy during compulsory prison visits.

Singapore has come under strong international criticism for its practice of judicial caning, especially after the 1994 Michael Fay incident. Amnesty International condemned the practice of judicial caning in Singapore as a "cruel, inhuman or degrading punishment". It is also regarded by some international observers as a violation of Article 1 in the United Nations Convention against Torture. However, Singapore is not signatory to the Convention. Human Rights Watch similarly referred to the practice of caning as "an inherently cruel punishment".

The Singaporean government has defended its stance on judicial caning and said that the punishment does not amount to torture and is conducted under strict standards and medical supervision. While most Singaporeans either support or are indifferent towards the practice of judicial caning, there is a minority – including dissident Gopalan Nair, lawyer M Ravi and businessman Ho Kwon Ping – who are completely or partially opposed to it.

A recipient of nine strokes thinks that even though it may be a nightmare the first time, an offender who has been caned before will have experienced the extent of fear of criminal punishment and so may not find it as much of a disincentive to commit repeat offences. He said, "After he knows what it's like, he will have nothing left to fear. He will know what to expect no matter how many strokes he gets – it's more of the same. No alcohol and women – apart from those two things, prison is really not that bad."

In 2022, President Halimah Yacob expressed the need to review the age limit for caning in the case of sex offenders, in light of several high-profile rape cases (especially those involving fathers raping their daughters), where most of the offenders aged 50 and above who escaped caning despite being harshly sentenced to lengthy periods of incarceration by the courts, including a 55-year-old cleaner who was jailed for 33 years after getting convicted of raping his three daughters over a 14-year period, a 54-year-old tutor and paedophile who was sentenced to 45 years' jail for the rape of eight children (including those with learning difficulties) and a fifty-year old man who got 23 years' jail for raping his eleven-year-old daughter over three months due to a Fengshui master's advice. While some expressed concerns over the deterrence effect of caning towards rapists aged more than fifty, most lawyers also supported the need for a review of the age limit for caning in relation to serious crimes like rape, as they felt that the suitability to cane should be decided based on health rather than age, and it may pave way to greater consistency behind sentencing. Among them, Criminal lawyer Johannes Hadi called the age limit of 50 "an arbitrary line in the sand", and questioned the exemption of females from caning based on sexist ideas about the physical difference between men and women. Another lawyer, Law Society of Singapore president Adrian Tan, commented about the need to cane rapists regardless of their age, "If you're fit enough to rape, you should be fit enough to be caned." Criminal lawyer Sunil Sudheesan also stated that there should also be measures to ensure a 50-year-old prisoner's suitability to cane based on his health to avoid any sudden health issues from arising during the caning process.

School caning 
Critics  argue that since Singapore is signatory to the Convention on the Rights of the Child, it is obliged to "take all appropriate legislative, administrative, social and educational measures to protect the child from all forms of physical or mental violence, injury or abuse". However, the Singaporean government stated that it considers "the judicious application of corporal punishment in the best interest of the child."

As Singapore evolves, some citizens may perceive that schools are refraining from using corporal punishment due to their fears of a strong backlash from parents. Educators, when interviewed, say that they are cognisant of Singapore's changing landscape, both in terms of the family structure as well as the influence of social media, in the reduction of corporal punishment in schools. They note that understanding and accepting such punishment is essential to the effectiveness of caning as a deterrent to misconduct. According to a Singaporean legal advice website, as long as schools administer corporal punishment according to MOE guidelines, parents may not take legal action against the school as they are not direct employers of the school.

In arts and media

Media
Behind Bars, a 1991 Singaporean television series produced by the Singapore Broadcasting Corporation in collaboration with the Singapore Prison Service. The drama portrays the lives of prison officers and convicts in prison. In two episodes, two convicts are separately punished by caning for breaking prison rules.
Prison Me? No Way!, a 15-minute video commissioned by Singapore's National Crime Prevention Council to deter teenagers from crime. The video, released in 1998 and filmed in Changi Prison and Changi Reformative Training Centre, shows life in prison from the perspectives of two young offenders and includes a reenactment of a judicial caning.
I Not Stupid, a 2002 Singaporean film by Jack Neo which reflects the daily lives and parental discipline of three Primary 6 students. One of the protagonists, Liu Kok Pin (Shawn Lee) is often caned by his mother (Xiang Yun) for neglecting his schoolwork. In another scene, one of the mothers (Selena Tan) tries to cane her two children Terry Khoo and Selena Khoo (Huang Po Ju and Cheryl Chan respectively) for causing a mishap at a hawker store.
Homerun, a 2003 Singaporean film by Jack Neo which reflects the relationships between two siblings, Chew Kiat Kun (Shawn Lee) and his sister Chew Seow Fang (Megan Zheng) and wealthy football leader, Tan Beng Soon (Joshua Ang), over a lost shoe. In the movie, Beng Soon was caned twice (privately) by his Mathematics teacher Mrs. Ang (Patricia Mok) for getting his classmate to do his homework for him.
Love is Beautiful, a 2003 Singaporean television series produced by MediaCorp Channel 8. In the drama, Huang Leshan is sentenced to 18 years' imprisonment and 12 strokes of the cane for raping Song Hui. The caning scene is briefly shown in one of the episodes when Huang recalls his ordeal.
Guru Paarvai, a 2004 Singaporean television series shown on Vasantham. In one episode, four students are caned in the school office for stealing and consuming beer outside school.
One More Chance, a 2005 Singaporean film by Jack Neo which portrays the lives of three convicts in prison. It also reflects the social stigma towards ex-offenders. In one scene, one of the three convicts receives his caning sentence of six strokes.
I Not Stupid Too, a 2006 Singaporean film by Jack Neo which reflects the lives of three ordinary Singaporean youngsters in school and their relationships with their families. One of the protagonists, Tom Yeo (Shawn Lee), is publicly caned in school for possessing an obscene video disc and assaulting his Chinese teacher Mr. Fu (Johnny Ng). The caning scene is graphically portrayed, with Tom bending over a desk on the stage in the school hall to receive three strokes in front of the assembled student body.
The Homecoming, a 2007 Singaporean television series produced by MediaCorp. In the drama, four men were convicted of arson in their youth and sentenced to imprisonment and three strokes of caning each. One of them received one more stroke, supposedly for being the mastermind. The caning scene is featured briefly in flashbacks.
Don't Stop Believin', a 2012 Singaporean television series produced by MediaCorp. In the drama, a secondary school student, Zhong Junliang (Xu Bin), is wrongly accused of molesting a female student. He is caned in front of the school assembly by the discipline master (Brandon Wong), who turns out to be his father.
Ilo Ilo, a 2013 Singaporean family film directed by Anthony Chen. In one scene, the main character Jiale (Koh Jia Ler) receives a public caning in school for fighting with his classmate.
Lion Moms, a Singaporean television series. In Season 1 (2015), Jeremy (Scott C. Hillyard) is publicly caned in school for shoplifting. In Season 2 (2017), Chae Lian (Lina Ng) publicly canes her daughter Hillary (Victoria Lim) on the hand for lying.
Chandi Veeran, a 2015 Indian film directed by A. Sarkunam. In the scene after the opening credits, the protagonist Paari (Atharvaa) receives three strokes of the cane in a Singaporean prison.
Take 2, a 2017 Singaporean comedy film about the lives of four ex-convicts, directed by Ivan Ho and produced by Jack Neo. In the prologue, the four (Ryan Lian, Wang Lei, Gadrick Chin and Maxi Lim) receive their caning sentences for different offences.
Rotan, a 2017 Singaporean short film shown at the Singapore International Film Festival 2017 and directed by Hamzah Fansuri. The film is about a father, who is also the discipline master at his son's school, having to uphold his own principles and punish his rebellious son for breaking the school rules.
My Guardian Angels, a 2020 Singaporean Chinese-language drama about three mothers struggling to raise their children alone. The drama depicts a paedophile basketball coach who molested teenage boys. The coach was jailed and caned, albeit off-screen in the 24th episode of the 30-episode-long drama.

Literature
The Caning of Michael Fay: The Inside Story by a Singaporean (1994), a documentary book by Gopal Baratham published in the wake of the controversial caning of Michael P. Fay. It concentrates on the personal aspects, the punishment and the sociology of caning in Singapore. The book includes some descriptions of caning and photographs of its results, as well as two personal interviews with men who had been caned before.
The Flogging of Singapore: The Michael Fay Affair (1994) by Asad Latif.

See also
Caning
Caning in Brunei
Caning in Malaysia
Corporal punishment in Taiwan
Judicial corporal punishment
School corporal punishment

References

External links
Criminal Procedure Code
National Crime Prevention Council
A clip of a staged reconstruction of a caning from a Singapore government video "Prison Me No Way"